The Gurglbach is a river of Tyrol, Austria.

The Gurglbach originates on the rock face  near Nassereith. It flows from west to east to Tarrenz, the only village that it passes completely through.

The river is one of the cleanest waters of Tyrol. It is a calm, slow running brook.

References

Rivers of Tyrol (state)
Rivers of Austria